The Forum of Ministers of the Environment of Latin America and the Caribbean is a body that meets under the United Nations Environment Programme to discuss environmental issues and priorities within the region.

Organization and participation
The Forum was formed in 1982 and is part of the United Nations Environment Programme in the Regional Office of Latin America and the Caribbean, with meetings every two years.  All thirty-three countries within the region are invited to be a part of the Forum, as are other interested parties including NGOs. The official languages of the Forum are Spanish and English.

The Conference of Ministers is preceded by a conference of High-Level Experts who meet ahead of the ministers in order to provide the technical information necessary for the ministers to make decisions. The forum is responsible for meeting to strategize action on themes related to sustainable development and the environment within Latin America and the Caribbean.

Meetings and objectives

*The event would normally have happened in 2020, however due to the pandemic the event was held in a virtual format for the first time, co-hosted by the Government of Barbados, which was where the event was supposed to take place in the previous year).

References

1982 establishments
United Nations Environment Programme
Latin America and the Caribbean